Mictopsichia janeae is a species of moth of the family Tortricidae. It is found in Ecuador.

The wingspan is 13–14 mm. The ground colour of the forewings is cream, consisting of numerous dots situated mainly in median and dorsal parts of the wing. The hindwings are orange yellow with a dark brown apical area with a few proximal paler spots.

Etymology
The species is named in honour of Dr. Jane Lyons.

References

Moths described in 2010
Mictopsichia
Moths of South America
Taxa named by Józef Razowski